Toni Sant (born 1968) is a Maltese academic and former radio and television presenter, producer and music journalist. He is Director of Digital Media & Film Production at Salford University and was formerly Reader in Digital Curation at the University of Hull's School of Arts & New Media on the Scarborough campus, England.

Sant has a B.A. in Theatre Studies from the University of Malta and an M.A. and Ph.D. in Performance Studies from New York University. His publications include the book Franklin Furnace & the Spirit of the Avant-Garde: A History of the Future  (2011, Intellect) about the Franklin Furnace Archive arts organisation in New York.

Sant joined Radio Malta in 1986 as a journalist on music programmes such as Kważi Kull Filgħaxija (1988/89), Mill-Garaxx (TVM - 1989/90), Il-Fil tat-Tiġdid (1989), Mal-20 bid-Daqq (1989/90), Immaġina: John Lennon (Radju Malta - 1990), Blast (TVM - 1990), Tutti Frutti (TVM - 1991). His television career included commentary for Malta at the 1991 Eurovision Song Contest.

In December 1991, Sant left TVM to begin a career as television and radio producer and programme manager for Radio One Live which produces Music programmes. Sant also remained associated with TVM as he produced music programmes for the station.

Sant was previously Senior Lecturer in Performance & Creative Technologies and Director of Research in the School of Arts and New Media at the University of Hull.

He has also been Education Organiser for Wikimedia UK. He is the artistic director of Spazju Kreattiv (formerly the St James Cavalier Centre for Creativity), Malta's national centre for creativity.

Currently Sant remains associated with music by broadcasting podcasts on his website.

Bibliography

References

External links

 ToniSant.com
 

1968 births
Living people
Maltese television presenters
Maltese radio personalities
Maltese journalists
Maltese television directors
Academics of the University of Hull
University of Malta alumni
Tisch School of the Arts alumni